Mislodežda is a village in the municipality of Struga, North Macedonia.

Demographics
As of the 2021 census, Mislodežda had 428 residents with the following ethnic composition:
Albanians 407
Persons for whom data are taken from administrative sources 21

According to the 2002 census, the village had a total of 720 inhabitants. Ethnic groups in the village include:
Albanians 717
Macedonians 1
Others 2

References

External links

Villages in Struga Municipality
Albanian communities in North Macedonia